Sorca Clarke is an Irish Sinn Féin politician who has been a Teachta Dála (TD) for the Longford–Westmeath constituency since the 2020 general election. She was elected on the first count and is the first Sinn Féin TD to serve the constituency since Ruairí Ó Brádaigh in 1957.

Political career
Clarke joined Sinn Féin in 2004 and first ran for office in 2009 when she unsuccessfully stood in the 2009 Irish local elections for Mullingar West in County Westmeath. She succeeded in her next attempt and became a member of Westmeath County Council at the 2014 local elections. She lost her seat on the council in the 2019 elections, placing just 9th out of 14 candidates, but became a Teachta Dála in 2020 as part of Sinn Féin's surge that year, topping the poll in her constituency.

Early and personal life
Clarke is from Artane, Dublin. She moved to Mullingar with her husband, Darren Caulfield, in 2005 where they run a security business together They have four children, including one with autism.

Clarke's grandfather was a member of the Irish Republican Army and was interned in the Curragh for membership of a proscribed organisation. In his later years, he joined Official Sinn Féin - "the Worker's Party" following the 1969 split between them and "Provisional" Sinn Féin.

References

External links
Sorca Clarke's page on the Sinn Féin website

Year of birth missing (living people)
Living people
Local councillors in County Westmeath
Members of the 33rd Dáil
Politicians from County Dublin
Sinn Féin TDs (post-1923)
21st-century women Teachtaí Dála